Karl Friedrich Ludwig Kannegiesser (1781-1861) was a German author, translator, and critic.

Biography
He was born at Wendemark, and was educated at Halle.

Work
He translated Beaumont and Fletcher (1808), the Divina Commedia (5th ed. 1873), Dante's lyrics (2nd ed. 1842), and many others, ranging from Horace's Odes, Anacreon, and Sappho to Chaucer, Byron, and Scott. He was also famed as an exegete of Goethe, and edited with valuable notes a selection from that author's lyrical verse (1835).

References
 

1781 births
1861 deaths
German non-fiction writers
University of Halle alumni
19th-century German translators